Louis-Étienne de Thouvenin (1791–1882) was a French Army general. He invented the carabine à tige ("stem rifle"  or "pillar breech rifle"), based on a method by which muzzle-loading rifles could be easily and effectively loaded.

Notes

19th-century French inventors
French generals
1791 births
1882 deaths